Nuttallburg (also known as Brown) was an unincorporated community located in Fayette County, West Virginia, named by English pioneer John Nuttall who discovered coal in the area. Nuttallburg had a post office until 1955. It is no longer inhabited and is just outside Winona.

Nuttalburg is located on the New River and was developed to house workers mining coal sold to the Chesapeake and Ohio Railway.  Henry Ford built a huge conveyor belt system to transport coal from the mine to the river and railroad below, but sold his interest in the mine in 1928.  Production ceased in 1958.

The town is included within the Nuttallburg Coal Mining Complex and Town Historic District, part of New River Gorge National Park and Preserve.

References

External links 
West Virginia Place Names
Nuttalburg West Virginia

Coal towns in West Virginia
Unincorporated communities in West Virginia
Ghost towns in West Virginia
History of West Virginia